Shoja (also Romanized as Shojāʿ) is a village in Jalalvand Rural District, Firuzabad District, Kermanshah County, Kermanshah Province, Iran. At the 2006 census, its population was 56, in 11 families.

References 

Populated places in Kermanshah County